Baron  was an admiral in the early Imperial Japanese Navy, noted for his role in the battleship  naval disaster of 1904.

Biography
Nashiba was born in Chōshū domain (now Yamaguchi prefecture, as the 4th son to a 1000 koku samurai retainer. As a child, he was adopted into the Nashiba family, and took their name. His older brother was Admiral Arichi Shinanojo.

As a samurai youth, he fought as a battalion commander in the Boshin War to overthrow the Tokugawa shogunate. He then served in the new Meiji government in the Railway Ministry from 1871.

During the First Sino-Japanese War, he was on the gunboat  followed by the corvette .

He was then promoted in July 1903 to rear admiral, commander in chief of the Kure Naval District and commander in chief of the Readiness Fleet.

With the Russo-Japanese War, Nashiba assumed command of the IJN 1st Fleet, which was responsible for blockading the Russian Pacific Fleet within Port Arthur. On the morning of 15 May, the squadron proceeded to patrol to east by north across the mouth of the port. This course brought the Japanese fleet into a minefield previously laid by the Russian minelayer Amur. Both Hatsuse and Yashima struck naval mines and were lost in the greatest Japanese naval disasters during the Russo-Japanese War.

After the war, Nashiba served in a number of staff positions at Yokosuka Naval District and Sasebo Naval District, and was appointed commander of the Mako Guard District. He was promoted the vice admiral in March 1907, and retired from active service in October of the same year.

In September 1907, Nashiba was ennobled with the title of baron (danshaku) under the kazoku peerage system and served in the House of Peers from 1911 to 1916.

Sources

External links

Notes

1850 births
1924 deaths
Imperial Japanese Navy admirals
People of the Boshin War
Japanese military personnel of the First Sino-Japanese War
Japanese military personnel of the Russo-Japanese War
Military personnel from Yamaguchi Prefecture
People of Meiji-period Japan
Samurai
Kazoku
Members of the House of Peers (Japan)